Jennifer S. Bryson is a Fellow in the Catholic Women's Forum of the Ethics and Public Policy Center. She previously worked at the Witherspoon Institute. She is also a professional translator, specializing in the works of the twentieth-century German writer Ida Friedericke Görres. She founded Let All Play, an organization that advocates the depoliticization of professional sports by targeting rainbow flags on uniforms. Bryson has a Ph.D. in Arabic and Islamic studies, from the Department of Near Eastern Languages and Civilizations at Yale University. From 2004 to 2006, she served as an interrogator at the Guantanamo Bay detention camps and has since become an outspoken supporter of humane, rapport-building interrogation, and an opponent of the use of torture. She is an adult convert to Catholicism.

Education

Bryson spent two years in Egypt learning the Arabic language in between her M.A. and Ph.D.

Bryson is a member of the Phi Alpha Theta honor society.

Careers

Television career

According to an article from the October 29, 2001 edition of the Chronicle of Higher Education, Bryson started working for as a television journalist and researcher in 2000. She worked for the PBS NewsHour and CBS's 48 Hours.

Embassy work

Bryson worked at the U.S. Embassies in Egypt and Yemen in 2002.

Career at the Department of Defense

Bryson served as an interrogator in the Guantanamo Bay detention camps, from 2004–2006. In an interview, she noted that her conscience as a Roman Catholic led her decisions and actions at Guantanamo, where she managed a counter-terrorism interrogation and analysis team. Her last position with the Defense Department was as the lead Action Officer for countering ideological support to terrorism within the Office of the Secretary of Defense in Support to Public Diplomacy.

Academic career

After her public service Bryson became the Director of the Islam and Civil Society Project at the Witherspoon Institute. She was previously a member of the Board of Directors of the Institute for Global Engagement. In August 2010 the Washington Post published an op-ed by Bryson, 
counseling tolerance for Muslims, after a Florida pastor had called on Americans to burn Qurans.

The Christian Post described Bryson as a "Christian scholar". In 2009 Bryson was on a panelist in a dialogue between evangelicals and Muslims. In September 2011 Bryson was a presenter at a conference on the role of non-Muslim scholars in Islamic Studies.

Children's books 
She is the creator of the Marvel, Believe, Care Creation Coloring Book (2023).

Translations 
Her translation of "Anti-Semitism Among Islamists in Germany," a 2019 report by the German government, was published by the Hudson Institute.

Her translation of the 1970 lecture "Trusting the Church" by Catholic writer Ida Friederika Görres and Joseph Ratzinger's 1971 Eulogy for Ida Friederike Görres were published in 2020.

Anti-LGBT Activism 

Bryson is the founder of Let All Play, a project of the Austin Institute for the Study of Family and Culture that works to discourage the use of political symbols at soccer matches, mostly targeting rainbow flags and other LGBT-friendly elements. She has also served on the Advisory Board of CanaVox, a reading group run by the Witherspoon Institute which criticizes the legality of gay marriage.

References

External links 
 

American religion academics
Year of birth missing (living people)
Living people